The 2016 Acrobatic Gymnastics World Championships was the 25th edition of acrobatic gymnastics competition and were held in Putian, China from April 1 to April 3, 2016.

Medal summary

Medal table

Results

References

Acrobatic Gymnastics World Championships
Acrobatic Gymnastics World Championships
International gymnastics competitions hosted by China
2016 in Chinese sport